Allhallows is a village and civil parish on the Hoo Peninsula in Kent, England. Situated in the northernmost part of Kent, and covering an area of 23.99 km2, the parish is bounded on the north side by the River Thames, and in the east by the course of Yantlet creek, now silted up. At the 2001 census the parish had a population of 1,649.

Allhallows village is in two parts: the ancient Hoo All Hallows and the 20th century holiday colony Allhallows-on-Sea.

Near to the village of Allhallows is Windhill Green. There used to be a hamlet on the site of Windhill Green, but all of the original buildings have been demolished. The name remains on the Ordnance Survey maps.

Hoo All Hallows

Hoo All Hallows is clustered round the parish church of All Saints, from which the village takes its name: Hallow meaning Saint. The Hoo (in 1285 written Ho) refers to a spur of land, and is thus a common element of place names on the spur or peninsula. Hoo All Hallows' parish registers date from 1629, and in 1841 the population was recorded as 268 people.

All Saints' Church itself dates from the 12th century. It is the only Grade I listed building on the Hoo Peninsula and is built of flint and stone with a lead roof. It has a west tower, north and south porches to the nave, and a chancel. The earliest part is the west end of the nave, followed by the south arcade. The north arcade dates from the early 13th century, while the chancel arch and screen are 14th century. Money was left in 1472 "to the werkes of the body of the church", possibly to the nave. The chancel was heavily restored in 1886–91. A notice in the church announces, "Previously scheduled for demolition under proposals for a London orbital international airport", referring to the 2004 putative Cliffe airport scheme.

A branch of the Pympe family lived on an estate with a mansion known as "Allhallows House".

Yantlet Creek was once part of a navigable and fortified trade route, used from Roman times. The Saxon Shore Way passes close by the old boundaries, indicating silting over many centuries.

Avery Farm

Avery Farm is on the tip of a promontory, which, in Anglo-Saxon times, is believed to have been an island in its own right, belonging to a woman named "Heahburh". It is thought she may have been an abbess, given that lands named after her were granted by the 7th century King Cædwalla of Wessex to the monastery at Medeshamstede, now known as Peterborough, presumably together with Hoo St Werburgh.

Allhallows-on-Sea

The modern holiday village of Allhallows-on-Sea lies to the north of the ancient village.

In the 1930s, the Southern Railway, in an attempt to develop the area around the estuary as a holiday resort, opened a short branch from the Hundred of Hoo Railway branch line to Grain. The terminus, Allhallows-on-Sea railway station, was north of the old village, and the new part of the settlement grew up around the railway station which had opened on 16 May 1932. The railway named its resort Allhallows-on-Sea in all its publicity. The planned development never took place, partly because of the onset of the Second World War, and the railway station closed on to 4 December 1961. There is now a holiday park that includes a 9-hole golf course, fresh water fishing lake, and a small entertainments complex with both indoor and outdoor pool. This park is operated by Bourne Leisure Ltd.

It was just after the First World War that Kent County Council and London County Council proposed the transformation of the remote and inhospitable marshland hamlet of All-Hallows into a major seaside resort, after the fashion of Victorian Herne Bay. By the 1930s the river front at Avery Farm, about a mile north of the village, was set to become a holiday resort.

Allhallows-on-Sea was planned as the best holiday resort in Europe, and was to have the largest swimming pool in the UK with the first artificial wave generator in Europe, and an amusement park four times the size of the Blackpool Pleasure Beach complex.

On 13 February 1937, the Gravesend Reporter carried the following:
When completed the park will be four times the size of the famous one at Blackpool. Other features include: zoological gardens, yachting centre, physical training stadium, the largest swimming pool in the country with artificial waves, holiday camp and 5,000 houses, up to date hotels, restaurants, theatres and cinemas. The development, which will take some seven years to complete is costing millions of pounds, and when finished, the town covering something like two and half square miles of land, should prove to be of great convenience to the millions of Londoners, and others."

The railway line was constructed with these proposals in mind. A large 1930s style pub, the British Pilot, was built to supersede the village inn, the Rose and Crown Tavern (now converted to a dwelling). This pub was itself closed in 2021 with agreed planning consent for other uses. Just opposite the parish church and old village shop (now long closed) and on the new approach way to the railway station, an art deco styled block of flats was added. But the overall plan never attracted the number of holidaymakers expected.

The holiday park is Haven Holidays.

Allhallows at war
On the morning of 15 October 1940, a Royal Air Force Squadron was involved in combat over the River Medway, and during a skirmish with a Messerschmitt Bf 109, the Spitfire R6642 was damaged by enemy fire, forcing Pilot Officer J. W. Lund to bail out. The aircraft crashed on the shoreline of the River Medway near Allhallows at 11:50 am. The pilot was rescued by the Navy, but his aircraft remained a wreck on the tidal mudflats of Allhallows until the summer of 1998 when the site was excavated.

Future proposals
In November 2011, Lord Foster published proposals to improve the transport system of south east England. Under these proposals, called the Thames Hub, new high-speed rail lines would be built connecting Kent and Europe with north London, and the north east and north west of England. The scheme would also involve the remodelling of the Thames Estuary, by the construction of a four-runway airport on the Isle of Grain, partially on land reclaimed from the estuary but including land at Allhallows and Lower Stoke. This plan is controversial.
Residents highlight the hazards presented by the presence of the wreck of the SS Richard Montgomery with its 1,400 tonnes of explosives, just off the Nore, and the natural gas terminals that import and temporarily store 20% of the UK's natural gas. In addition there are 300,000 birds that breed along the flight path. Aviation specialists point to the difficulty of fitting another airport in this crowded airspace.

Notes and references

External links

 Allhallows Parish Council

Villages in Kent
Civil parishes in Kent
Populated coastal places in Kent
Populated places on the River Thames